Buguri ( Top) is a 2015 Indian Kannada language film directed by M. D. Sridhar. It stars Ganesh, Richa Panai and Erica Fernandes. Sridhar had previously worked with Ganesh in the films like Chellata (2006) and Krishna (2007). The film's cinematography is handled by AV Krishnakumar and the music has been composed by Mickey J Meyer.

Plot
Krishna (Ganesh) is sent back by his fiancée Ishanya (Erica Fernandes) to pursue back his college lover Nandini (Richa Panai). But after meeting her, he realises she is engaged and returns to Ishanya.

Cast
 Ganesh as Krishna
 Richa Panai as Nandini
 Erica Fernandes as Ishanya
 Sadhu Kokila
 Ashok
 Chitra Shenoy
 Sudha Belawadi
 Saritha Jain
 H. G. Dattatreya
 Srinagar Kitty as Karthik (cameo appearance)

Production
Buguri got a kick-off by Darshan and V Ravichandran attending the opening function. The film started shooting in June 2014 and had an 80-day schedule. It completed shooting in December 2014. Golden star Ganesh has learnt skating for this film and horse riding he became familiar with this film. Horses were brought from Hubli. Ganesh remembered the skating practice he has done helped him in action portions.

Soundtrack
The movie's songs have been composed by Mickey J. Meyer.

References

External links
 

2015 films
Films scored by Mickey J Meyer
2010s Kannada-language films
Films directed by M. D. Sridhar